Shravana Banthu is a 1984 Indian Kannada-language romantic drama film, written and directed by Singeetham Srinivasa Rao. The film stars Rajkumar, Urvashi and Srinath. The film, produced by P. A. Kameshwara Rao, deals with reincarnation as the subject where the lead roles get killed for their romance and then they are shown to be reborn again and fall in love yet again in the backdrop of inter-faith marriage. The dialogues and lyrics were written by Chi. Udaya Shankar. The film was received exceptionally well at the box-office and was one of the biggest hits of 1984. This was the first Kannada movie to show a computer on-screen. The director remade the movie in the same year in Telugu as Vasantha Geetam.

Plot 
The film has a reincarnation plot with a secular message. The singer Kumar (Rajkumar), on a pilgrimage to a temple he saw in his dreams, meets the spirit of his friend Vishwa (Srinath), unrequited from an earlier birth. The friend recalls their previous lives in which they had been in love with the same woman Urvashi (Urvashi). She loved Kumar and Vishwa had ordered his men to kill his rival, unaware that this was his friend Kumar. Realising his mistake, he committed suicide and his spirit was condemned to wander until redemption had been achieved. The woman from their earlier life, now reborn as Mary, a Christian, is courted by Kumar with the assistance of the spirit. The two eventually marry after overcoming the resistance of Kumar's caste-conscious father. This segment involves a comic turn when Kumar pretends to have lost his memory and becomes "Peter from Petersburg".

Cast 
 Rajkumar as Raghu/Kumar/Peter 
 Srinath as Vishwa
 Urvashi as Urvasi/ Mary / Saraswati
 K. S. Ashwath as Kumar's Father
 Leelavathi as Mary's Mother
 Thoogudeepa Srinivas as Mary's Father
 Shivaram 
 Uma Shivakumar
 Advani Lakshmi Devi
 Vijayaranjini
 Vishwanath

Soundtrack 
The music was composed by M. Ranga Rao to the lyrics of Chi. Udaya Shankar. All the songs were received exceptionally well and are considered evergreen hits of Kannada cinema.

References

External links 
 
 Raaga info

1984 films
1980s Kannada-language films
Indian romantic drama films
Films scored by M. Ranga Rao
Films about reincarnation
Films directed by Singeetam Srinivasa Rao
Kannada films remade in other languages
1984 romantic drama films